Lois Perkins Chapel is a chapel on the Southwestern University campus in Georgetown, Texas, United States. Built in 1950, the chapel is named after alumnae Lois Perkins.

References

External links
 

1950 establishments in Texas
Buildings and structures completed in 1950
Buildings and structures in Georgetown, Texas
Chapels in the United States
Southwestern University
University and college chapels in the United States